Bahala Creek is a stream in the U.S. state of Mississippi. It is a tributary to the Pearl River.

Bahala most likely is the Choctaw language word meaning "(standing) mulberry". A variant name is "Big Bahala Creek".

References

Rivers of Mississippi
Rivers of Copiah County, Mississippi
Rivers of Lawrence County, Mississippi
Rivers of Lincoln County, Mississippi
Tributaries of the Pearl River (Mississippi–Louisiana)
Mississippi placenames of Native American origin